Histiothrissa is an extinct genus of prehistoric ray-finned fish that lived during the Santonian.

References

Clupeiformes
Late Cretaceous fish
Prehistoric ray-finned fish genera